Proline-rich AKT1 substrate 1 (PRAS) is a protein that in humans is encoded by the AKT1S1 gene.

References

Further reading

External links